Silvia Mittermüller (born 8 August 1983 in Munich) is a German snowboarder. Born in Munich, Germany, Mittermüller currently trains in the United States. She competes on the Swatch TTR World Snowboard Tour. She has sponsorship deals with Ride Snowboards, Oakley, Vans and Planet Sports.

Competition Results
Highlights of the Swatch TTR 2008/2009 Season
4th - Slopestyle - 6Star Burton European Open - Ticket to Ride (World Snowboard Tour)
1st - Slopestyle - 5Star Burton Canadian Open - Ticket to Ride (World Snowboard Tour)
3rd - Slopestyle - 5Star Nissan X-Trail Jam - Ticket to Ride (World Snowboard Tour)

References

External links
 Official webpage  
Silvia Mittermueller's official Swatch TTR Website

1983 births
Living people
German female snowboarders
X Games athletes
Snowboarders at the 2018 Winter Olympics
Olympic snowboarders of Germany
Sportspeople from Munich
21st-century German women